Atlético Acreano is a Brazilian professional football club based in Rio Branco, Acre founded on 27 April 1952. It competes in the Campeonato Acreano, the top flight of the Acre state football league. 

Atlético is the top ranked team from Acre in CBF's national club ranking, at 68th overall.

History
The club was founded in 1952, under the name "Beirut" for Syrian-Lebanese traders. Among them are Augusto Hidalgo de Lima, Foch Jardim, Roberto Sanches Mubárac, Lourival Pinho, Pereira de Lima, Goldwasser Pereira Santos, Sílvio Ferrante, Mário D'Avila Maciel, Rufino Farias Vieira, Fernando Andrade Pessoa, among others.

Several other families had an important passage and that are parts of the club's history, such as Diógenes, Pinho, Ribeiro, Frota, and Patriota.

With great values, Atlético Acreano began to dominate the Segundo Distrito. The passion that the blue and white team caused, soon received the slogan "Glória de um Povo, orgulho de Uma Cidade". (The glory of a people, proud of a city).

Honours

 Campeonato Acreano
 Winners (9): 1952, 1953, 1962, 1968, 1987, 1991, 2016, 2017, 2019

Rivalries
Atlético's rivals are Rio Branco and Juventus.

References

External links
  Atlético Acreano at Arquivo de Clubes

Association football clubs established in 1952
Football clubs in Acre (state)
1952 establishments in Brazil